Jorge Ortiz is a retired Mexican professional mixed martial artist currently competing in the Welterweight division. A professional since 2002, he has competed for Strikeforce, Shooto, Bellator, and King of the Cage.

Strikeforce
At Strikeforce: Shamrock vs. Gracie, Ortiz lost to Eugene Jackson by unanimous decision.

Bellator
At Bellator II, Ortiz defeated Aaron Romero by unanimous decision.  This bout was a quarterfinal of the Bellator Season One Welterweight Tournament.

At Bellator VII, Ortiz was defeated by Lyman Good by stoppage.  This bout was a semifinal of the Bellator Season One Welterweight Tournament.

Mixed martial arts record

|-
| Win
| align=center| 19–9–1 (1)
| Ant'wan Williams
| TKO (punches)
| Imperio MMA: Rocky Point Beach Bash
| 
| align=center| 2
| align=center| 3:30
| Puerto Peñasco, Mexico
| 
|-
| Win
| align=center| 18–9–1 (1)
| Alejandro Baez
| Decision (unanimous)
| The Supreme Cage 1
| 
| align=center| 3
| align=center| 5:00
| Monterrey, Nuevo León, Mexico
| 
|-
| Loss
| align=center| 17–9–1 (1)
| Julio Cesar Cruz
| Decision (unanimous)
| Grand Prix FMP 2011
| 
| align=center| 3
| align=center| 5:00
| Chihuahua, Mexico
| 
|-
| Win
| align=center| 17–8–1 (1)
| Alejandro Baez
| Submission (triangle choke)
| Combate Extremo: Greco vs. Ortiz
| 
| align=center| 1
| align=center| 2:20
| Monterrey, Nuevo León, Mexico
| 
|-
| Loss
| align=center| 16–8–1 (1)
| Willie Parks
| Decision (split)
| BloodSport Championships: Time to Bleed
| 
| align=center| 3
| align=center| 5:00
| El Paso, Texas, United States
| 
|-
| Loss
| align=center| 16–7–1 (1)
| Terry Martin
| Decision (split)
| PWP: War on the Mainland
| 
| align=center| 3
| align=center| 5:00
| Irvine, California, United States
| 
|-
| Loss
| align=center| 16–6–1 (1)
| Nate James
| Decision (split)
| C3 Fights: Knockout-Rockout Weekend 3
| 
| align=center| 3
| align=center| 3:00
| Concho, Oklahoma, United States
| 
|-
| Loss
| align=center| 16–5–1 (1)
| Lyman Good
| TKO (doctor stoppage)
| Bellator 7
| 
| align=center| 2
| align=center| 4:37
| Chicago, Illinois, United States
| Bellator Season One Welterweight Tournament Semifinal.
|-
| Win
| align=center| 16–4–1 (1)
| Aaron Romero
| Decision (unanimous)
| Bellator 2
| 
| align=center| 3
| align=center| 5:00
| Uncasville, Connecticut, United States
| Welterweight debut; Bellator Season One Welterweight Tournament Quarterfinal.
|-
| Win
| align=center| 15–4–1 (1)
| Ulysses Cortez
| Decision (unanimous)
| COF 13: Aztec Alliance
| 
| align=center| 3
| align=center| 5:00
| Tijuana, Baja California, Mexico
| 
|-
| Loss
| align=center| 14–4–1 (1)
| Jesse Taylor
| TKO (punches)
| Total Combat 21
| 
| align=center| 2
| align=center| 1:09
| San Diego, California, United States
| 
|-
| Win
| align=center| 14–3–1 (1)
| John Cronk
| TKO (punches)
| No Limits: Proving Ground
| 
| align=center| 1
| align=center| 1:43
| Irvine, California, United States
| 
|-
| Win
| align=center| 13–3–1 (1)
| Brady Fink
| Decision (unanimous)
| Total Combat 19
| 
| align=center| 3
| align=center| 5:00
| Yuma, Arizona, United States
| 
|-
| Win
| align=center| 12–3–1 (1)
| John Cronk
| TKO (doctor stoppage)
| Cage Fighting Federation
| 
| align=center| 1
| align=center| N/A
| Albuquerque, New Mexico, United States
| 
|-
| Win
| align=center| 11–3–1 (1)
| Prince McLean
| TKO (corner stoppage)
| MMA Mexico
| 
| align=center| 1
| align=center| 5:00
| Monterrey, Nuevo León, Mexico
| 
|-
| Win
| align=center| 10–3–1 (1)
| Francisco Ayon
| Submission (triangle choke)
| MMA Mexico
| 
| align=center| 2
| align=center| 2:31
| Mexico
| 
|-
| Win
| align=center| 9–3–1 (1)
| Enrique Luna
| Submission (strikes)
| MMA Mexico
| 
| align=center| N/A
| align=center| N/A
| Mexico
| 
|-
| Loss
| align=center| 8–3–1 (1)
| Eugene Jackson
| Decision (unanimous)
| Strikeforce: Shamrock vs. Gracie
| 
| align=center| 3
| align=center| 5:00
| San Jose, California, United States
| 
|-
| Draw
| align=center| 8–2–1 (1)
| Paul Kisor
| Majority draw
| Shooto: Proving Ground
| 
| align=center| 2
| align=center| 5:00
| St. Louis, Missouri, United States
| 
|-
| Loss
| align=center| 8–2 (1)
| Jon Fitch
| Decision (unanimous)
| MMA Mexico: Day 1
| 
| align=center| 3
| align=center| 5:00
| Ciudad Juárez, Chihuahua, Mexico
| 
|-
| Win
| align=center| 8–1 (1)
| Jason Guida
| Decision (unanimous)
| MMA Mexico: Day 1
| 
| align=center| 3
| align=center| 5:00
| Ciudad Juárez, Chihuahua, Mexico
| Catchweight (190 lbs) bout.
|-
| Loss
| align=center| 7–1 (1)
| Joey Villaseñor
| Submission (strikes)
| KOTC: Hostile Takeover
| 
| align=center| 1
| align=center| 3:19
| Acoma, New Mexico, United States
|For the KOTC Middleweight Championship.
|-
| Win
| align=center| 7–0 (1)
| Chee Bates
| TKO (punches)
| Independent Event
| 
| align=center| 1
| align=center| 0:40
| Bernalillo, New Mexico, United States
| 
|-
| Win
| align=center| 6–0 (1)
| Al Delgado
| KO (punches)
| KOTC: New Mexico
| 
| align=center| 1
| align=center| 1:00
| Albuquerque, New Mexico, United States
| 
|-
| NC
| align=center| 5–0 (1)
| Jason Guida
| No contest
| Ultimate Fighting Mexico
| 
| align=center| 1
| align=center| N/A
| Monterrey, Nuevo León, Mexico
| 
|-
| Win
| align=center| 5–0
| Brett Shafer
| TKO (punches)
| Cage Fighting Monterrey
| 
| align=center| N/A
| align=center| N/A
| Monterrey, Nuevo León, Mexico
| 
|-
| Win
| align=center| 4–0
| Wes Lindsay
| Submission (punches)
| Ultimate Fighting Mexico
| 
| align=center| 2
| align=center| N/A
| Monterrey, Nuevo León, Mexico
| 
|-
| Win
| align=center| 3–0
| Tim Green
| TKO (punches)
| Aztec Challenge 1
| 
| align=center| 1
| align=center| N/A
| Ciudad Juárez, Chihuahua, Mexico
| 
|-
| Win
| align=center| 2–0
| Edward Kim
| TKO (punches)
| MMA: Cuando Hierve la Sangre
| 
| align=center| 1
| align=center| N/A
| Monterrey, Nuevo León, Mexico
| 
|-
| Win
| align=center| 1–0
| Filameno Fackrell
| Submission (rear-naked choke)
| Combate Libre Mexico 2
| 
| align=center| N/A
| align=center| N/A
| Mexico
|

References

External links
 

Living people
Mexican male mixed martial artists
Welterweight mixed martial artists
Year of birth missing (living people)